Fuzi Lizhong Wan is a brownish-black pill used in Traditional Chinese medicine to "warm and reinforce the spleen and the stomach". It is slightly aromatic, and it tastes pungent and slightly sweet. It is used where there is "deficiency-cold syndrome of the spleen and stomach marked by cold sensation and pain in the epigastrium, vomiting, diarrhea and cold extremities".

Chinese classic herbal formula

See also
 Chinese classic herbal formula
 Bu Zhong Yi Qi Wan
 Aconitum carmichaelii

External links
, Fu Zi (Radix Aconiti Lateralis Praeparata)

References

Traditional Chinese medicine pills